Carrie Quinlan is a British actress and comedy writer. She is a cast member of John Finnemore's Souvenir Programme and the youngest child of Mary and Michael Quinlan.

History
Quinlan attended Nonsuch High School in Surrey and Cherwell School in Oxford, before studying History at Bristol University. While there she met and worked with comedians Marcus Brigstocke and Dan Tetsell, and directors Tamara Harvey and Jonathan Munby. After university Quinlan worked as a stand-up comedian, coming runner-up in So You Think You're Funny and the BBC New Comedy Award.

She trained as an actor at the Guildhall School of Music and Drama. She started out performing in the theatre, appearing in plays such as Hedda Gabler, As You Like It, Measure for Measure and The Seagull. She also began writing comedy for television and radio, starting out on shows such as The Now Show, That Mitchell and Webb Sound and The Late Edition. From 2006-2009, Quinlan became a regular panellist on The News Quiz, where she and chairman Sandi Toksvig often bantered about their respective heights. During this period she also wrote comment pieces for New Humanist, The Royal Society of Arts, The Tablet and The Guardian.

After a career break as a teacher, training and studying Children's Literature at Jesus College, Cambridge, she returned to acting and writing full-time in 2013.

Theatre work includes Smash! by Jack Rosenthal at the Menier Chocolate Factory; 66 Books (Job, by Neil LaBute) at the Bush Theatre and several seasons with the Lamb Players, where she has played Beatrice in Much Ado About Nothing, Viola in Twelfth Night, Helena in A Midsummer Night's Dream and Rosaline in Love's Labour's Lost.

She has been a member of the cast of John Finnemore's Souvenir Programme since it started in 2011, and has appeared on Reluctant Persuaders, Be Lucky, ElvenQuest,  Alone (Radio Series), Agendum and others on radio, and New Tricks, Miranda and Yonderland among others on television.

References

British actresses
British comedy writers
British humanists
British journalists
Living people
Alumni of the Guildhall School of Music and Drama
Year of birth missing (living people)